Leonard Wootton (13 June 1925 – 9 September 1990) was an English footballer who played as a forward for Port Vale, Queen of the South, and Wrexham. He won the Scottish Football League Division Two title with Queen of the South in 1950–51.

Career
Wootton joined Port Vale in August 1945 and played regularly in the war leagues. As the 1946–47 season returned to the pre-war norms, he only played ten Third Division South and four FA Cup games before being replaced on the right-wing by Don Triner. He scored his first goal in the Football League in a 2–1 win over Crystal Palace at Selhurst Park on 26 October. He also scored two goals in the FA Cup, in wins over Finchley and Watford at The Old Recreation Ground. However, he asked manager Gordon Hodgson for a transfer in January 1947 and was released in the summer. He moved on to Jimmy McKinnell's Queen of the South in Scotland. The "Doonhamers" were relegated out of the First Division at the end of the 1949–50 season, only to win the Division Two title in 1950–51. He scored one goal in 19 league games at Palmerston Park. He went on to score two goals in 20 Third Division North games for Peter Jackson's Wrexham in the 1951–52 season.

Career statistics
Source:

Honours
Queen of the South
Scottish Football League Division Two: 1950–51

References

1925 births
1990 deaths
Footballers from Stoke-on-Trent
English footballers
Association football forwards
Port Vale F.C. players
Queen of the South F.C. players
Wrexham A.F.C. players
English Football League players
Scottish Football League players